SIES College of Commerce & Economics is an educational institute located at Sion, Mumbai. Established by the South Indian Education Society, the college is a South Indian linguistic minority institution.

History
SIES College of Commerce & Economics was established by the South Indian Education Society in May 1989.

College started with a single faculty college with over 400 students, 7 Lecturers and 1 Librarian which now has post graduate and undergraduate courses in Commerce, IT, Management, Banking & Insurance, Accounting & Finance to over 2692 students. The Junior College with 1000 students give the college a combined strength of over 3600 students. This college is affiliated to University of Mumbai.

Courses

Junior College
FYJC
SYJC

Degree College
B.Com
BMS
B.Sc.(IT)
B.Com. (Accounting & Finance)
B.Com. (Banking & Insurance)
B.Com. (Financial Markets)
B.Sc. (Information Technology)

Grades

It received an A grade from the NAAC Peer in 2009. The college is also ISO 9001:2008 certified.

Infrastructure/Facilities
Gymkhana and Canteen in Ground floor.
College Library cum Reading hall with internet facilities in First floor.
B.Sc (IT) / Electronic / Telecommunication / Computer-Lab.
Internet Facility Available in All Systems.

Fests
SIES students organize & participate in various events each year.

 Disha
A career fest, which not only educates the students about various career options but also brings eminent personalities to guide them.
 Fantasies
Fantasies is the cultural festival of SIES College of Commerce & Economics. It is one of the inter-collegiate events organized by the students in Central Mumbai Zone. It has over 60 events and gathers a crowd of over 6000 for the three-day festival. Its standout event, Thunderstruck, showcases India's finest bands performing live at Shanmukhananda Auditorium.
 EDIT
IT Tech Fest organized by the B.Sc.(I.T.) department of the college which is held every year. The events organized by EDIT are categorized as lab, non-lab, classroom and fillers. Although it is a tech fest, there are events for students from various streams to enjoy.

See also
SIES College of Arts, Science, and Commerce
SIES Nerul

References

Universities and colleges in Mumbai
Educational institutions established in 1989
1989 establishments in Maharashtra
Colleges in India